Gaudenz Beeli is a Swiss bobsledder who competed in the mid-1970s. He won a silver medal in the four-man event at the 1974 FIBT World Championships in St. Moritz.

Beeli also finished fourth in the four-man event at the 1972 Winter Olympics in Sapporo.

References
Bobsleigh four-man world championship medalists since 1930
Wallechinsky, David (1984). "Bobsled: Four-man". In The Complete Book of the Olympics: 1896 - 1980. New York: Penguin Books. p. 561.

Bobsledders at the 1972 Winter Olympics
Living people
Swiss male bobsledders
Year of birth missing (living people)
Olympic bobsledders of Switzerland
20th-century Swiss people